Hydrophylloideae is a subfamily of the plant family Boraginaceae. Their taxonomic position is somewhat uncertain. Traditionally, and under the Cronquist system, they were given family rank under the name Hydrophyllaceae, and treated as part of the order Solanales. More recent systems have recognised their close relationship to the borage family, Boraginaceae, initially by placing Hydrophyllaceae and Boraginaceae together in an order Boraginales, and most recently by demoting Hydrophyllaceae to a subfamily of Boraginaceae. However the placement and circumscription of Boraginaceae is still uncertain: it is unplaced at order level, and there is some prospect of it being split up again in future.

Plants in this subfamily may be annual or perennial herbs or shrubs, with either a prostrate or an erect stem.  Most have a taproot.  The flowers are bisexual, and normally radial, with 5 petals and 5 stamens.  About 20 genera, containing around 300 species, are recognised; many of them are native to the western United States.

The subfamily takes its name from the genus Hydrophyllum (waterleaf).  Well known members include Emmenanthe (whispering bells), Nemophila (baby blue eyes) and Phacelia (scorpionweed).

Genera

References

External links

 Global Biodiversity Information Facility: Hydrophyllaceae

 
Asterid subfamilies